The HX family are a range of purpose-designed tactical military trucks manufactured by Rheinmetall MAN Military Vehicles (RMMV). The HX range was disclosed in 2003, and the first order was placed in 2004. The HX range replaced the earlier FX and LX ranges in production. The HX2 range, which currently complements the original HX range, was announced in 2012. The first HX2 range trucks were delivered in April 2016. The HX and HX2 ranges originally complemented the SX range, but as of 2019 they had replaced the SX range as the type was no longer produced. The HX3 range was announced in May 2021, with series production scheduled for 2024.

History
Rheinmetall MAN Military Vehicles (then MAN) confirmed it was developing the HX range at Defence Vehicles Dynamics (DVD) 2003 and a developmental example shown later in the year at DSEi 2003. The earlier LX range was superseded by the HX range in 2004. The FX range was superseded in 2005.

The first order for the HX range came from the British Army which announced in October 2004 that it had selected the MAN ERF UK Ltd proposal to meet the Support Vehicle requirement. The contract was awarded in March 2005.

At Eurosatory 2012 RMMV displayed publicly for the first time an example of the HX2 range.

On 6 May 2021 Rheinmetall unveiled the HX3.

Rheinmetall MAN Military Vehicles (RMMV): For clarity, the HX range of trucks were developed and initially manufactured by MAN (Maschinenfabrik Augsburg-Nürnberg) Nutzfahrzeuge AG, however the technical parent of these trucks is now Rheinmetall MAN Military Vehicles (RMMV). RMMV came about in 2010 with the announced merger of the military truck activities of the then MAN Nutzfahrzeuge AG with Rheinmetall's wheeled military vehicle activities. This merger essentially united the complementary technological core competencies of MAN's automotive expertise in commercial vehicle manufacture with Rheinmetall's technological know-how in the military land sector/systems field. The result was the creation of a single source provider for a wide range of armoured and unarmoured wheeled vehicles. Under the terms of the agreement, Rheinmetall had a stake of 51% and MAN 49% in the new company. RMMV is now part of Rheinmetall's Vehicle Systems Division (VSD). In July 2019 Rheinmetall announced that the company was pursuing a buyback of some shares held by MAN Truck & Bus in the RMMV joint venture (JV) company, specifically 100% of shares in the tactical vehicle segment of the business. As of September 2019, RMMV (which remains a 51/49% JV) only produces military and militarised trucks, with tactical vehicles now produced by 100% Rheinmetall-owned Rheinmetall Military Vehicles.

Description
The HX/HX2 ranges of trucks combine militarised commercial driveline and chassis with a further updated version of a modular military-specific cab. The HX/HX2 ranges are based on chassis and driveline components of MAN's commercial TG WorldWide heavy truck range which was first introduced in 2000. The HX2 range use a dedicated chassis.

MAN water-cooled diesel engines of various power outputs and emissions compliance are used across the range, these including the D0836, D2066, D2676 and D2868. The engine remains positioned conventionally (longitudinally between the chassis rails), however, the cooling pack is located transversally at the rear of the cab. This location offers protection from damage and blockage of the radiator with mud etc. when operating off-road. It also allows for a larger volume radiator to be used, which enhances hot-climate operating capability.

A ZF AS-Tronic automated constant mesh gearbox (branded TipMatic in MAN’s commercial product line up) with 12 forward and two reverse gears is standard fit, this coupled to a MAN two-speed transfer case. A powershift-type fully automatic transmission is an option.

Drive axles are MAN single tyre hub-reduction, and with the exception of the heavier tractor units which are full-time all-wheel drive for traction and torque distribution reasons, all models have selectable front axle(s) drive. All axles have cross-axle differential locks and there are longitudinal differential locks in rear (and front on 8×8 and 10×10 chassis) axle combinations and the transfer case. Axle weight ratings are 9000 kg or 11,000 kg for front axles, and 10,000 kg for rear axles with single wheels/tyres.

Front steer-drive axles (including the 2nd axle on 8×8/10×10 chassis) are sprung by a combination of parabolic leaf springs with progressively acting rubber assistors and hydraulic telescopic shock absorbers. Rear axles are sprung by inverted multi-leaf trapezoidal springs with radius rod and an anti-roll bar. A conventional rear bogie set-up is employed for 6×6 and 8×8 chassis. The HX45M 10×10 features hydropneumatic suspension for the rear three axles.

The standard 14.00 R 20 tyres may be replaced by 395/85 R 20, 525/65 R 20 or 16.00 R 20 tyres if required. A central tire inflation system (CTIS) or semi-automatic tire inflation system and run-flat inserts are options.

All models can climb a 60% gradient, traverse a 40% sideslope, have an approach angle of 40 degrees, and ford 750 mm of water without preparation, this increasing to 1.5 m with preparation.

With the exception of the modular military cab, the location of the cooling pack and a small number of military specific ancillary items and modifications, for cost efficiency reasons RMMV has strived for maximum commonality with the TG commercial product.

HX3

The HX3 was unveiled on 6 May 2021. Like it predecessors, the HX3 is designed for purpose and is classed a military-off-the -shelf (MOTS) product. The HX3 will be available in 4x4, 6x6, 8x8, and 10x10 configurations, with the 8x8 and 10x10 options available with active rear suspension and rear-axle steer options. A fully Automated Load Handling System (ALHS) and Universal Torsion-Resistant Subframe (UTRS) will further enhance capability in the traditional logistics role, while the Artillery Truck Interface (ATI) could see the 10x10 utilised in future as the standard basis for various artillery solutions or similar systems.

The HX3 remains based around militarised MAN commercial components, with new safety features carried across from the commercial product including Emergency Brake Assist (EBA), Adaptive Cruise Control (ACC) and Lane Departure Warning (LDW), all of these disconnectable for tactical applications. EURO 6 engines are standard, these compatible with military grade fuels following limited modifications. For consistent use on lower grade fuels (up to 5000 ppm sulfur), a EURO 2 engine option is an option. Autonomous driving options will also be available.

The flat-paneled military cab of the HX/HX2 models has been redesigned for the HX3. A new single piece flat mine blast protecting floor is used, this allowing for standard commercial seats to be used for the crew, these with five-point harnesses if required. Air-conditioning is now relocated from the roof to within the new dashboard assembly, the compressed air cylinders now moved from the chassis frame rails to the roof. All stowage boxes are watertight, the HX3 capable of fording in up to 1.5 m of salt water. Other off-road performance criteria includes a vertical step of 590 mm and an approach angle of 40 degrees. The HX3-specific chassis frame allows for up to 400 mm of torsional twist.

Armoured cabs
To meet increasing demands for crew protection on deployed operations the HX range was designed from the outset with protection options in mind. In standard configuration a blast-proof vertical split-windscreen is fitted, and a riot protection kit is available for the cab. For more significant threats an appliqué protection kit, for which vehicles are prepared to accept at the production stage, have been developed in conjunction with Ressenig of Austria and Rheinmetall of Germany. Known as the Modular Armour Cabin (MAC), in basic specification these kits weigh around 1500 kg. The cab hard-top remains removable for air-transport if required.

A swap-cab armouring solution known as the Integrated Armour Cabin (IAC) is also available. The IAC was originally developed in conjunction with Krauss-Maffei Wegmann (KMW) for the SX range of trucks, this suited to models with twin front axles only. A Rheinmetall-developed IAC option is now available, this suitable for all HX range trucks, depending on front axle rating and protection levels. Australia, Norway, and Sweden are receiving trucks with this cab which is manufactured at a purpose-constructed facility recently opened at Rheinmetall's facility in Unterlüß, Germany.

World record attempt - Chile
On 6 November 2017 Rheinmetall announced the company was a main sponsor for high-altitude record-breaking attempt that had commenced that day. Using two HX range trucks (a 340 hp 4×4 HX40M and a 440 hp 6×6 HX58) the expedition aimed to reach the highest point on earth accessible to motor vehicles – the 6890 m-tall Ojos del Salado, the world’s highest active volcano, located on the border of Chile and Argentina. In order to set a new world record the vehicles would have to reach an altitude of at least 6,690 metres above sea level. On December 19 it was announced the altitude record attempt had been called off at a height of 6,150 m for a combination of factors including an insurmountable rock barrier and adverse weather conditions. The team had, however, built two refuge huts during their ascent, the highest of these built at 6,100 m, a record.

Gallery

Operators
  - 2536 HX models ordered in July 2013 as the Phase 3B part of project Land 121. Australia was the first customer to receive HX2 variants. First vehicle handover occurred on 7 April 2016, when 6 HX77 (8×8) and 6 HX40M (4×4) were handed over. A further 1044 ordered in July 2018 as Land 121 Phase 5B, an extension of Phase 3B. Initial Operating Capability for Phase 3B trucks declared in February 2020. As of April 2021 around 800 trucks were left to build and deliver, with final deliveries expected during 2023.
  - Just over 50 HX trucks. Totals include 20 HX77 8×8 configured with a load handling system and armoured cab in 2006, plus 20 HX42M 6×6 and four HX81 HETs ordered around 2017/2018, and five HX44M 8×8 (2 x TEP 90; 3 x heavy recovery) on order as of 2019.
  - Small quantity (possibly 2); use unknown.
  - Just over 200 HX trucks to all branches of the armed forces from late 2006. Totals include 113 HX77 8×8 fitted with a load handling system, 83 HX77 8×8 in conventional cargo/tanker truck configurations, about five HX58 6×6 in tractor unit configuration to the Danish Air Force, and four HX60 4×4 in container/cargo configuration.
  - On 6 July 2017 it was announced that RMMV had entered a seven-year framework agreement with the Bundeswehr to supply up to 2271 HX2 trucks worth around €900 million. An initial batch of 558 trucks worth around €240 million (including training support) were ordered for delivery between 2018 and 2021. The first 20 trucks were handed over to the Bundeswehr in November 2018. A second batch of trucks were ordered in June 2019, the order valued at €420 million and covering 252 trucks (161 5-tonne HX42M (6×6) and 91 15-tonne HX45M (8×8) and including specialist tools and training support. A further 60 trucks were ordered in November 2019, and in December 2019 a further 1000 additional trucks were ordered (675 5-tonne HX42M (6×6) and 325 15-tonne HX45M (8×8)) for €382 million. Under the Bundeswehr’s Unprotected Transport Vehicle (UTF) programme, these HX2 trucks will replace the old KAT I generation of trucks made by MAN, some of which have been in service for forty years. The Germany Army also operates a fleet of RMMV HX81 8×8 heavy equipment transporters coupled to DOLL semi-trailers. By July 2015 the Bundeswehr had ordered 21 HX81 with armoured cabs in three batches from 2006 (2 + 12 + 7). In June 2018 a seven year framework-type award to RMMV was made for up to 137 HX81 (now known as Elefant 2 or SaZgM 70t mil). Total contract value could reach EUR122 million and an initial 32 vehicles valued at about EUR32 million were ordered, these vehicles featuring the same unprotected driver’s cab as the UTF family of vehicles. In December 2020 Rheinmetall announced an award for a further 24 vehicles to be delivered during 2021, with 24 more in 2022. Value of this award was given as EUR41 million. In June 2020 Rheinmetall announced a further Bundeswehr order for HX range trucks. It was disclosed that Germany's Federal Office for Bundeswehr Equipment, Information Technology and In-Service Support (BAAINBw) had entered into a framework contract with RMMV for delivery of up to 4,000 trucks fitted with a hooklift system, many of which will feature armoured driver’s cabs. Running from 2021 to 2027 for Rheinmetall the framework contract represents around €2 billion in total sales volume. An initial tranche of 540 vehicles worth around €348 million have been ordered, and of these 230 will be protected. Delivery starts 2021 
  - Contract award to Rába. Production of Rába H-14, H-18, and H-25 trucks commenced in 2004, these initially locally designed chassis fitted with MAN engines, associated components including cooling system and the MAN modular military cab. Later production was HX CKD using some locally sourced components such as axles. About 300 examples were built using components supplied between 2004-2006, with a further 250 assembled from CKD kits delivered from 2007. Hungary also received around 80 RMMV HX77 8×8 trucks. A follow-on contract is being negotiated.
  - Five HX60 4×4 fitted with specialist EOD container bodies to the Army. Delivery of the latest two examples was announced on 22 August 2016.
  - Used for the chassis of Type 19 155 mm Wheeled Self-propelled Howitzer. At least 28 8x8 units have been introduced since 2019.
  - In July 2012 a sale of 83 HX60 4×4 trucks in cargo, water, and fuel tanker configurations to the Kuwait National Guard (KNG) was disclosed.
  - Under a Defence Force Land Transport Capability Programme project to replace an aged Medium and Heavy Operational Vehicle Fleet (MHOV), New Zealand received 194 HX range trucks. Also in service are four HX77 8×8 supplied from UK stocks.
  - Norway's Defence Logistics Organisation (NDLO) announced on 31 March 2014 it had signed two contracts with RMMV, an initial purchase contract and a through-life logistics support contract. Norway's initial order calls for about 120 HX2 and TG MIL range trucks, with HX2 variants accounting for the bulk of the order. It includes 95 HX 8×8 and eight HX45M 10×10 recovery. First deliveries occurred during 2018. As of April 2021 around 250 HX range trucks are thought to have been ordered by Norway and Sweden combined. This is a framework agreement that includes Sweden and the original intention was to buy up to 2,000 military logistics vehicles before 2026.
  - In November 2016 it was announced that an undisclosed international customer had awarded Rheinmetall a €134 million contract for 110 HX81 with semi-trailers for delivery between January 2018 and February 2019, with additional orders envisaged. Specific configuration details of the combination were not released, but the contract value included comprehensive service and logistical support for a period of five years.  - Singapore operates around 60 HX44M 8×8 with recovery hampers provided by EMPL of Austria.
  - From May 2011 the Slovakian Army received 20 HX77 8×8 configured as container carriers.
  - In May 2014 Sweden placed an initial order with RMMV for trucks. The initial order is for 215 trucks, of which 62 are HX2, the bulk of these HX44M 8×8. Deliveries commenced during 2017. In 2018 another 40 HX2 were ordered as a system carrier for the Patriot air defense system, and in 2019 24 HX2 were ordered as a carrier for the ammunition handling system belonging to the Archer artillery system. This is a framework agreement that includes Norway and the original intention was to buy up to 2,000 military logistics vehicles before 2026. As of April 2021 around 250 HX range trucks are thought to have been ordered by Sweden and Norway combined.
  - Small quantity, use unknown but thought to be 'system carrier' application, and possibly radar.
  - Supplied via Aselsan; small quantity, use unknown but thought to be 'system carrier' application.
  - The UAE is understood to operate a small number of HX81 8×8 heavy equipment transporters.
  - It was announced in October 2004 that the UK Defence Procurement Agency (DPA) had selected the MAN ERF UK Ltd proposal for the UK armed forces' Support Vehicle requirement; a contract award followed in March 2005. The base contract award covered 5,165 vehicles and 69 recovery trailers with the first vehicles entering service in June 2007. Total Support Vehicle contract deliveries to the UK Ministry of Defence totalled 7,415 + 69 trailers (7,484), this figure including a contract option, plus some delivery revisions and additional orders. The Support Vehicle contract called for two model ranges to be delivered to the MoD, SX and HX, with a >90% quantity bias towards HX models.
  - HX58 and HX77 variants are used for the chassis of Israeli-made SPYDER surface-to-air missile systems that were acquired & operated by its Air Defense - Air Force.
  - Small quantity supplied for OPFOR roles during training.
  Egypt, Finland and Oman are suggested as possible users in small quantities.''
   - In exchange for sending 28 Slovenian M55S tanks (upgraded T-55 tanks) to Ukraine, Germany handed over 40 MAN HX 8×8 RMMV trucks to Slovenia in December 2022.

See also
 MAN LX and FX ranges of tactical trucks - Predecessors of HX range
 MAN KAT1 - Predecessor of SX range
 MAN SX - Successor to KAT 1, originally complemented HX range
 RMMV Survivor R - Wheeled armoured vehicle offered by RMMV
 YAK - Wheeled armoured vehicle offered by RMMV
 Armoured Multi-Purpose Vehicle - Wheeled light armoured/multirole vehicle offered by RMMV in a JV with KMW
 Boxer - Wheeled armoured vehicle offered by RMMV in a JV with KMW
 Rheinmetall MAN Military Vehicles - JV of MAN and Rheinmetall for wheeled vehicles
 TPz (Transportpanzer) Fuchs - Wheeled armoured personnel carrier
 List of modern equipment of the German Army

References

Notes

Bibliography

External links

 First trucks to Australia
 Australia Land 121
 Eurosatory 2016: IHS Jane’s talks to Rheinmetall MAN Military vehicles on their HX range of trucks
 New Zealand Army
 Rheinmetall Defence - HX Series High Mobility Trucks
 Rheinmetall Defence - Mammut HX 8×8 High Mobility Truck (HX81)
 HX81 with Goldhofer trailer
 Rheinmetall Defence - Military Mobility Trucks
 Rheinmetall Defence - HX Series High Mobility Trucks (Danish)
 MAN HX77 (Danish)
 MAN HX 77 protected by Rheinmetall ROSY
 MHOV - All New Army trucks (New Zealand)
 HX - High mobility truck system (Rheinmetall Defence page)
 Rheinmetall MAN Military Vehicles GmbH (Rheinmetall Defence RMMV page)
 Trucks on track. A successful year for Rheinmetall MAN Military Vehicles GmbH (RMMV)
 Rheinmetall MAN Military Vehicles IDEX 2013

HX
Post–Cold War military vehicles of Germany
Military trucks of the United Kingdom
Military trucks of Germany
Rheinmetall
MAN SE
Off-road vehicles
Military transport
Military logistics